Muncie Indiana Transit System (MITS) is the local bus service for Muncie, Indiana. MITS has 14 routes that originate in downtown Muncie and branch out about four miles in all directions. Some routes add buses during school hours to help shuttle students. MITSPlus vehicles are available upon request by disabled people who cannot use the mass-transit buses.

Awards 
MITS won the American Public Transportation Association's Outstanding Public Transit System Award in 2005 and 2008.
American Public Transportation Association's Gold Award for Safety Award 2007.

Fares 
Students, school faculty, and staff, and children under 12 (limit 3 per fare-paying passenger) ride for free.
Senior citizens and disabled people pay a quarter to ride plus free transfers or $0.50 for a 24-hour pass.
Adults pay $0.50, with free transfers, or $1 for a 24-hour pass.

Routes

References 

Bus transportation in Indiana
Muncie, Indiana
Transportation in Delaware County, Indiana
Transit agencies in Indiana